The Old Cawker City Library at 7th and Lake Sts. in Cawker City, Kansas, United States, was built in 1885.  It was listed on the National Register of Historic Places in 1973.  It was built by local carpenter John Rodger and stonemason William Foster.

References

External links

Library buildings completed in 1884
Buildings and structures in Mitchell County, Kansas
Libraries on the National Register of Historic Places in Kansas
National Register of Historic Places in Mitchell County, Kansas